Allison Tant (born 1961) is an American former lobbyist, Democratic Party of Florida chair, and politician serving as a member of the Florida House of Representatives from the 9th district. She assumed office on November 3, 2020.

Early life and education 
Tant was born in Jacksonville, Florida. She attended Duncan U. Fletcher High School in Neptune Beach, Florida graduating in 1979. She earned a Bachelor of Arts degree in communication and a Bachelor of Science in psychology from Florida State University.

Career 
Tant has worked as a lobbyist for Holland & Knight and Steel Hector & Davis International. From 2014 to 2016, she served as chair of the Florida Democratic Party. In July, 2016, Tant cast Florida's ballots in the 2016 Democratic National Convention for Hillary Clinton. Tant did not seek re-election as chair after the 2016 United States elections, in which Hillary Clinton lost Florida to Donald Trump and Democrats gained only three seats in the Florida Legislature. In November 2020, Tant was elected to the Florida House of Representatives, succeeding Loranne Ausley.

Personal life 
Tant is married to Barry Richard, an attorney and former member of the Florida House of Representatives who was one of several lawyers who represented George W. Bush in Bush v. Gore. Tant and Richard have three children.

References 

Living people
People from Jacksonville, Florida
Democratic Party members of the Florida House of Representatives
Florida State University alumni
Women state legislators in Florida
1961 births
21st-century American women